Baliochila fragilis, the fragile buff, is a butterfly in the family Lycaenidae. It is found in southern Somalia, eastern Kenya and northern Tanzania. Its habitat consists of deciduous thorn-bush country, forests and woodland.

References

Butterflies described in 1953
Poritiinae